Jacques-Philippe Lallemant (c. 1660, Saint-Valery-sur-Somme – 1748) was a French Jesuit, of whom little is known beyond his writings. He took part in the discussion on the Chinese rites, and wrote the “Journal historique des assemblées tenues en Sorbonne pour condamner les Mémoires de la Chine” (Paris, 1700), a defense of his confrère Lecomte against the Sorbonnist, Jacques Lefèvre.
 
In his “Histoire des Contestations sur la Diplomatique” (Paris, 1708) he sided with the Jesuits Jean Hardouin and Papebroch against the Benedictine Mabillon.

Works

His principal works are against the Jansenists. In close succession he published: “Le Père Quesnel séditieux dans ses Réflexions sur le Nouveau Testament” (Brussels, 1704); “Jansénius condamné par l'Eglise par lui-même, par ses défenseurs et par St-Augustin” (Brussels, 1705); “Le véritable esprit des nouveaux disciples de St-Augustin” (Brussels, 1706-7); “Les Hexaples ou les six colonnes sur la Constitution Unigenitus” (Amsterdam, 1714), with a number of pamphlets in defense of the same; “Entretiens au sujet des affaires présentes par rapport à la religion” (Paris, 1734–1743). The better to counteract Quesnel's “Réflexions morales”, Lallemant composed, in collaboration with other Jesuits (e.g. Bouhours and Michel), “Réflexions morales sur le Nouveau Testament traduit en français” (Paris, 1713–25), which Fénelon styled very pious and capable of guiding the reader through any part of the sacred text. This work, translated into many languages, enjoyed a well-deserved popularity, and the latest edition (Lille, 1836) was warmly praised by the “Revue Catholique”.

Lallemant is also the author of “Le Sens propre et littéral des Psaumes de David” (Paris. 1709) and of “L’Imitation de Jésus-Christ, traduction nouvelle” (Paris, 1740), of which there have been countless editions and translations. The Mémoires de Trévoux (August, 1713, and May, 1714) contain several dissertations with Lallemant's initials, and the Jansenists attributed to him several writings like the “Mandement of M. de Vintimille contre les Nouvelles Ecclésiastiques” (1732) and the supplement to the “Nouvelles Ecclésiastiques”(1734-8).

Original Sources 

Augustin de Backer and Carlos Sommervogel, Bibliothèque des Ecrivains de la Compagnie de Jesus, s. v.
Joseph Marie Quérard, Auteurs pseudonymes et anonymes, s. v.
Barbier, Dictionnaire des ouvrages anonymes.

1660s births
1748 deaths
People from Saint-Valery-sur-Somme
18th-century French Jesuits
18th-century French Catholic theologians